Laassa, also known as Lahassa, is a town in the northern Obock region of Djibouti.

Climate

External links
Satellite map at Maplandia.com

Populated places in Djibouti